Li Ming-kao (born 22 November 1932) is a Taiwanese naval officer and politician.

Li graduated from the Republic of China Naval Academy and Armed Forces University and assumed a succession of leadership positions in the Republic of China Navy. Between 1993 and 2002, he was elected to the Legislative Yuan via proportional representation party list as a representative of the Kuomintang.

References

Members of the 3rd Legislative Yuan
Party List Members of the Legislative Yuan
Republic of China Navy officers
National Defense University (Republic of China) alumni
1932 births
Living people
Kuomintang Members of the Legislative Yuan in Taiwan
Members of the 2nd Legislative Yuan
Members of the 4th Legislative Yuan